Articolo 18-bis Legge 91/1981 (Article 18B of Law no. 91 of 1981) also known as Decreto Spalmadebiti (Debt-Rubbing Decree) and Decreto Salva Calcio (Save Football Decree) is an Italian law introduced in 2003 by Law N°27/2003, itself ratified the decree-law N°282/2002 issued by the Prime Minister and owner of AC Milan Silvio Berlusconi. The law allows football clubs to defer the amortization expense of intangible assets (player contracts) into 10 equal annual installments. Generally speaking, transfer fees paid to other clubs were capitalized as intangible assets. In accounting, tangible assets were depreciated and intangible assets amortized. At that time, Italian clubs had broken the world transfer record several times. Most clubs relied on player profit as a revenue source, with cash-plus-player deals the most popular method of increasing profit. For example, Juventus signed Gianluigi Buffon and Lilian Thuram for a total of 180 billion lire (€92.96 million). However, Parma also received Jonathan Bachini for an undisclosed fee and Juventus earned €10 million on Bachini.

In some cases high-priced player trades were used to increase short-term profit, stressing future budgets. Vratislav Greško, who was signed for one year by Internazionale for DM9.5 million (€4.857 million), was sold to Parma in 2002 for €16 million; Matías Almeyda, who joined Parma with Hernán Crespo, also sold from Parma to Inter for €16 million. Both Greško and Almeyda left the club after one and two years, respectively, for an undisclosed fee and free transfer. A similar situation occurred in Parma and Rome in 2001; Mangone, Poggi and Gurenko were priced at a total of ₤65 billion (€33,569,698) in a trade with Fuser, Longo and Lassissi. However, Fuser played only briefly for Rome and Gurenko only briefly for Parma. Rome also traded with other clubs in June 2002 (the end of the 2001–02 financial year), including Luigi Sartor (€9.5 million) for Sebastiano Siviglia (€9 million). Internazionale (€-319 million), Milan (€-242 million), Roma (€-234 million) and Lazio (€-213 million) were the most indebted clubs; while Fiorentina declared bankruptcy by insolvency in 2002. However, all professional clubs in the country, with the exception of Serie A's Juventus and Serie B's Sampdoria, had relieved its debt with this law.

Examples
After the establishment of the amortization fund, amortization was lower in general. After the players became free agents, their deferred value was still counted as assets; this was unacceptable by International Financial Reporting Standards (IFRS) or Italian standards. The deferment was borrowing future income. Although future team resources would be limited, according to a University of Salerno research paper the deferred cost might allow a club to utilize the tax allowance more effectively.

Note: Changes in amortization may also be due to investment of player assets or player contract extensions; the amortization time frame may also affect its amount.

It was reported that 15 clubs had set up such special amortization fund, for example A.S. Roma, A.C. Milan and F.C. Internazionale Milano.

Aftermath 
The European Union rejected the law in 2003. (formal rendering in 2005)

The clubs faced another shortfall in 2007, after Decree-Law 115/2005 abolished Article 18B; they had to abolish the amortization fund by 30 June 2007, five years before the original scheduled date. UEFA required all clubs to use IFRS, and the fund was incompatible with the standard.

Before 2006, Napoli was bankrupt when its owner refused to increase share capital in 2004 but the club was revived debt-free as a new company by current owner Aurelio De Laurentiis. When Parma was under administration, most of its toxic assets were written off and its balance sheet was transferred to new company Parma FC SpA. A.S. Roma recapitalized several times during the 2003–04 season, swinging between positive and negative net equity since 2006. During the 2005–06 season Roma had a net equity of €67,808,577 in a separate balance sheet, with the special 10-year fund of €80,189,123 on the asset side; if the fund was entirely deferred amortization, the club had a negative equity of €12,380,546 on the separate balance sheet. Using IFRS in the 2006–07 financial year, on 30 June 2006 Roma had a 2005–06 negative net equity of €22,980,335 on the separate balance sheet. The club created a subsidiary, Soccer SAS di Brand Management, revaluing the brand at €125.122 million. Although Lazio had a positive equity of €29,637,929 with the special fund at €127,746,321, if the fund contained deferred amortization only the club had a negative equity of €98,108,392. In 2006–07 Lazio also changed to IFRS, with a reclassified negative net equity for the previous season of €25,406,939. The club overcome the shortfall on a separate balance sheet with subsidiary SS Lazio Marketing & 
Communication, selling its brand to the subsidiary for €104.5 million; this boosted the separate balance sheet but not the consolidated one. Internazionale and Milan made similar moves, despite large cash injections by the owner of both clubs.

Footnotes

References
general
 
specific

Further reading
 

Law of Italy
2003 in Italy
2003 in law
Association football law
History of football in Italy
2002–03 in Italian football
2006–07 in Italian football
Association football controversies